The Tuff Truck Challenge is an offroad 4x4 rock crawling event held since 2001. The event has always been held at a private property/farming land in Milbrodale in the Hunter Valley of NSW, Australia.

The event runs for 3 days with spectators camping. It was traditionally held near or on the Easter break, however has been moved to a weekend in September from 2019.

Over the weekend teams, made up of a driver and navigator, must attempt to compete a number of courses marked out though rocks, trees and soil. Teams gain points the further they progress through the course, but lose points for a variety of errors (such as, using reverse gear, winching, touching the bunting or cones, etc.). Each course has a time limit but often vehicles breakdown, rollover or get stuck midway before they are able to complete the course. While there is a set time limit to complete the course, there is no points advantage for finishing the course in a quicker time - it's not a race and making it so would change the categorisation of the event requiring a different safety protections for the competitors, staff and spectators. As the event is about low-speed technical crawling, spectators can get relatively close to the course with a high degree of safety.

History
Initially, competing vehicles were required to be road-worth and registered with their various state's motor registries. Over the years this rule was removed as vehicles became modified beyond what was legally allowed on public roads to complete the harder course layouts. Also, road rules would not have allowed the roll-cage safety requirements that are now in the rules. Vehicles must still be based on original road-going vehicles and contain a portion of original chassis and visual look.

The event is currently run by previous multi-time winner, Peter Antunac through his events company 'Tuff Events & Promotions Australia Pty Ltd'. He took over the event management in 2010 after winning the event in his highly modified Toyota Landcruiser the year before. The event was previously run by a 4x4 Club.

In 2015 the event featured on Australian sport television program RPM in a segment with Kate Peck. In the same year, the same team behind the event started a 2nd event called "King of the Hunter" as the "under license" version of King of the Hammers from America. Event Director Peter Antunac competed in the ULTRA4 class winning all 4 races.

Event statistics

See also

References

External links

Off-roading
Motorsport in New South Wales
Motorsport in Australia
Motorsport competitions in Australia